McKinley Morganfield (April 4, 1913 April 30, 1983), known professionally as Muddy Waters,  was an American blues singer and musician who was an important figure in the post-war blues scene, and is often cited as the "father of modern Chicago blues". His style of playing has been described as "raining down Delta beatitude".

Muddy Waters grew up on Stovall Plantation near Clarksdale, Mississippi, and by age 17 was playing the guitar and the harmonica, emulating the local blues artists Son House and Robert Johnson. He was recorded in Mississippi by Alan Lomax for the Library of Congress in 1941. In 1943, he moved to Chicago to become a full-time professional musician. In 1946, he recorded his first records for Columbia Records and then for Aristocrat Records, a newly formed label run by the brothers Leonard and Phil Chess.

In the early 1950s, Muddy Waters and his band—Little Walter Jacobs on harmonica, Jimmy Rogers on guitar, Elga Edmonds (also known as Elgin Evans) on drums and Otis Spann on piano—recorded several blues classics, some with the bassist and songwriter Willie Dixon. These songs included "Hoochie Coochie Man," "I Just Want to Make Love to You" and "I'm Ready". In 1958, he traveled to England, laying the foundations of the resurgence of interest in the  blues there. His performance at the Newport Jazz Festival in 1960 was recorded and released as his first live album, At Newport 1960.

Muddy Waters' music has influenced various American music genres, including rock and roll and rock music.

Early life
Muddy Waters' place and date of birth are not conclusively known. He stated that he was born in 1915 in Rolling Fork in Sharkey County, Mississippi, but other evidence suggests that he was born in the unincorporated community of Jug's Corner, in neighboring Issaquena County, in 1913. In the 1930s and 1940s, before his rise to fame, the year of his birth was reported as 1913 on his marriage license, recording notes, and musicians' union card. A 1955 interview in the Chicago Defender is the earliest in which he stated 1915 as the year of his birth, and he continued to state that year in interviews from that point onward. The 1920 census lists him as five years old as of March 6, 1920. The Social Security Death Index, relying on the Social Security card application submitted after his move to Chicago in the mid-1940s, lists him as being born April 4, 1913. His gravestone gives his birth year as 1915.

His grandmother, Della Grant, raised him after his mother died shortly after his birth. Grant gave him the nickname "Muddy" at an early age because he loved to play in the muddy water of nearby Deer Creek. "Waters" was added years later, as he began to play harmonica and perform locally in his early teens. He taught himself to play harmonica. The remains of the cabin on Stovall Plantation where he lived in his youth are now at the Delta Blues Museum in Clarksdale, Mississippi.

He had his first introduction to music in church: "I used to belong to church. I was a good Baptist, singing in the church. So I got all of my good moaning and trembling going on for me right out of church," he recalled. By the time he was 17, he had purchased his first guitar. "I sold the last horse that we had. Made about fifteen dollars for him, gave my grandmother seven dollars and fifty cents, I kept seven-fifty and paid about two-fifty for that guitar. It was a Stella. The people ordered them from Sears-Roebuck in Chicago." He started playing his songs in joints near his hometown, mostly on a plantation owned by Colonel William Howard Stovall.

Career

Early career, early 1930s–1948
In the early 1930s, Muddy Waters accompanied Big Joe Williams on tours of the Delta, playing harmonica. Williams recounted to Blewett Thomas that he eventually dropped Muddy "because he was takin' away my women [fans]".

In August 1941, Alan Lomax went to Stovall, Mississippi, on behalf of the Library of Congress to record various country blues musicians. "He brought his stuff down and recorded me right in my house," Muddy told Rolling Stone magazine, "and when he played back the first song I sounded just like anybody's records. Man, you don't know how I felt that Saturday afternoon when I heard that voice and it was my own voice. Later on he sent me two copies of the pressing and a check for twenty bucks, and I carried that record up to the corner and put it on the jukebox. Just played it and played it and said, 'I can do it, I can do it'." Lomax came back in July 1942 to record him again. Both sessions were eventually released by Testament Records as Down on Stovall's Plantation. The complete recordings were reissued by Chess Records on CD as Muddy Waters: The Complete Plantation Recordings. The Historic 1941–42 Library of Congress Field Recordings in 1993 and remastered in 1997.

In 1943, Muddy headed to Chicago with the hope of becoming a full-time professional musician.  He later recalled arriving in Chicago as the single most momentous event in his life. He lived with a relative for a short period while driving a truck and working in a factory by day and performing at night. Big Bill Broonzy, then one of the leading bluesmen in Chicago, had Muddy open his shows in the rowdy clubs where Broonzy played. This gave him the opportunity to play in front of a large audience. In 1944, he bought his first electric guitar and then formed his first electric combo. He felt obliged to electrify his sound in Chicago because, he said, "When I went into the clubs, the first thing I wanted was an amplifier. Couldn't nobody hear you with an acoustic." His sound reflected the optimism of postwar African Americans. Willie Dixon said that "There was quite a few people around singing the blues but most of them was singing all sad blues. Muddy was giving his blues a little pep." 

In 1946, Muddy recorded some songs for Mayo Williams at Columbia Records, with an old-fashioned combo consisting of clarinet, saxophone and piano; they were released a year later with Ivan Ballen's Philadelphia-based 20th Century label, billed as James "Sweet Lucy" Carter and his Orchestra – Muddy Waters' name was not mentioned on the label. Later that year, he began recording for Aristocrat Records, a newly formed label run by the brothers Leonard and Phil Chess. In 1947, he played guitar with Sunnyland Slim on piano on the cuts "Gypsy Woman" and "Little Anna Mae". These were also shelved, but in 1948, "I Can't Be Satisfied" and "I Feel Like Going Home" became hits, and his popularity in clubs began to take off. Soon after, Aristocrat changed its name to Chess Records. Muddy Waters's signature tune "Rollin' Stone" also became a hit that year.

Commercial success, 1948–1957 
Initially, the Chess brothers would not allow Muddy Waters to use his working band in the recording studio; instead, he was provided with a backing bass by Ernest "Big" Crawford or by musicians assembled specifically for the recording session, including "Baby Face" Leroy Foster and Johnny Jones. Gradually, Chess relented, and by September 1953 he was recording with one of the most acclaimed blues groups in history: Little Walter Jacobs on harmonica, Jimmy Rogers on guitar, Elga Edmonds (also known as Elgin Evans) on drums, and Otis Spann on piano. The band recorded a series of blues classics during the early 1950s, some with the help of the bassist and songwriter Willie Dixon, including "Hoochie Coochie Man", "I Just Want to Make Love to You", and "I'm Ready"

Muddy Waters's band became a proving ground for some of the city's best blues talent, with members of the ensemble going on to successful careers of their own. In 1952, Little Walter left when his single "Juke" became a hit, although he continued a collaborative relationship long after he left, appearing on most of the band's classic recordings in the 1950s. Howlin' Wolf moved to Chicago in 1954 with financial support earned through his successful Chess singles, and the "legendary rivalry" with Muddy Waters began. The rivalry was, in part, stoked by Willie Dixon providing songs to both artists, with Wolf suspecting that Muddy was getting Dixon's best songs. 1955 saw the departure of Jimmy Rogers, who quit to work exclusively with his own band, which had been a sideline until that time.

In the mid-1950s, Muddy Waters' singles were frequently on Billboard magazine's various Rhythm & Blues charts including "Sugar Sweet" in 1955 and "Trouble No More", "Forty Days and Forty Nights", and "Don't Go No Farther" in 1956. 1956 also saw the release of one of his best-known numbers, "Got My Mojo Working", although it did not appear on the charts. However, by the late 1950s, his singles success had come to an end, with only "Close to You" reaching the chart in 1958.  Also in 1958, Chess released his first compilation album, The Best of Muddy Waters, which collected twelve of his singles up to 1956.

Performances and crossover, 1958–1970 
Muddy toured England with Spann in 1958, where they were backed by local Dixieland-style or "trad jazz" musicians, including members of Chris Barber's band. At the time, English audiences had only been exposed to acoustic folk blues, as performed by artists such as Sonny Terry, Brownie McGhee, and Big Bill Broonzy.  Both the musicians and audiences were unprepared for his performance, which included electric slide guitar playing.  He recalled:

Although his performances alienated the old guard, some younger musicians, including Alexis Korner and Cyril Davies from Barber's band, were inspired to go in the more modern, electric blues direction. Korner and Davies' own groups included musicians who would later form the Rolling Stones (named after Muddy's 1950 hit "Rollin' Stone"), Cream, and the original Fleetwood Mac.

In the 1960s, Muddy Waters' performances continued to introduce a new generation to Chicago blues.  At the Newport Jazz Festival, he recorded one of the first live blues albums, At Newport 1960, and his performance of "Got My Mojo Working" was nominated for a Grammy award. In September 1963, in Chess' attempt to connect with folk music audiences, he recorded Folk Singer, which replaced his trademark electric guitar sound with an acoustic band, including a then-unknown Buddy Guy on acoustic guitar. Folk Singer was not a commercial success, but it was lauded by critic Joe Kane, and in 2003 Rolling Stone magazine placed it at number 280 on its list of the 500 greatest albums of all time. In October 1963, Muddy Waters participated in the first of several annual European tours, organized as the American Folk Blues Festival, during which he also performed more acoustic-oriented numbers.

In 1967, he re-recorded several blues standards with Bo Diddley, Little Walter, and Howlin' Wolf, which were marketed as Super Blues and The Super Super Blues Band albums in Chess' attempt to reach a rock audience. The Super Super Blues Band united Howlin' Wolf and Muddy Waters, who had a long-standing rivalry. It was, as Ken Chang wrote in his AllMusic review, flooded with "contentious studio banter [...] more entertaining than the otherwise unmemorable music from this stylistic train wreck". In 1968, at the instigation of Marshall Chess, he recorded Electric Mud, an album intended to revive his career by backing him with Rotary Connection, a psychedelic soul band that Chess had put together. The album proved controversial; although it reached number 127 on the Billboard 200 album chart, it was scorned by many critics, and eventually disowned by Muddy Waters himself:

Nonetheless, six months later he recorded a follow-up album, After the Rain, which had a similar sound and featured many of the same musicians.

Later in 1969, he recorded and released the album Fathers and Sons, which featured a return to his classic Chicago blues sound. Fathers and Sons had an all-star backing band that included Michael Bloomfield and Paul Butterfield, longtime fans whose desire to play with him was the impetus for the album. It was the most successful album of Muddy Waters' career, reaching number 70 on the Billboard 200.

Resurgence and later career, 1971–1982

In 1971, a show at Mister Kelly's, an upmarket Chicago nightclub, was recorded and released, signalling both Muddy Waters's return to form and the completion of his transfer to white audiences.

In 1972, he won his first Grammy Award, for Best Ethnic or Traditional Recording for They Call Me Muddy Waters, a 1971 album of old, but previously unreleased recordings.

Later in 1972, he flew to England to record the album The London Muddy Waters Sessions. The album was a follow-up to the previous year's The London Howlin' Wolf Sessions. Both albums were the brainchild of Chess Records producer Norman Dayron, and were intended to showcase Chicago blues musicians playing with the younger British rock musicians whom they had inspired. Muddy Waters brought with him two American musicians, harmonica player Carey Bell and guitarist Sammy Lawhorn. The British and Irish musicians who played on the album included Rory Gallagher, Steve Winwood, Rick Grech, and Mitch Mitchell. Muddy was dissatisfied by the results, due to the British musicians' more rock-oriented sound. "These boys are top musicians, they can play with me, put the book before 'em and play it, you know," he told Guralnick. "But that ain't what I need to sell my people, it ain't the Muddy Waters sound. An' if you change my sound, then you gonna change the whole man." He stated, "My blues look so simple, so easy to do, but it's not. They say my blues is the hardest blues in the world to play." Nevertheless, the album won another Grammy, again for Best Ethnic or Traditional Recording.

He won another Grammy for his last LP on Chess Records: The Muddy Waters Woodstock Album, recorded in 1975 with his new guitarist Bob Margolin, Pinetop Perkins, Paul Butterfield, and Levon Helm and Garth Hudson of the Band. In November 1976 he appeared as a featured special guest at The Band's Last Waltz farewell concert, and in the subsequent 1978 feature film documentary of the event.

From 1977 to 1981, blues musician Johnny Winter, who had idolized Muddy Waters since childhood and who had become a friend, produced four albums of his, all on the Blue Sky Records label: the studio albums Hard Again (1977), I'm Ready (1978) and King Bee (1981), and the live album Muddy "Mississippi" Waters – Live (1979). The albums were critical and commercial successes, with all but King Bee winning a Grammy. Hard Again has been especially praised by critics, who have tended to describe it as his comeback album.

In 1981, Muddy Waters was invited to perform at ChicagoFest, the city's top outdoor music festival. He was joined onstage by Johnny Winter and Buddy Miles, and played classics like "Mannish Boy", "Trouble No More", and "Mojo Working" to a new generation of fans. The performance was made available on DVD in 2009 by Shout! Factory. On November 22, he performed live with three members of British rock band the Rolling Stones (Mick Jagger, Keith Richards and Ronnie Wood)  at the Checkerboard Lounge, a blues club in Bronzeville, on the South Side of Chicago, which was established in 1972 by Buddy Guy and L.C. Thurman. A DVD version of the performance was released in 2012.

In 1982, declining health dramatically stopped his performance schedule. His last public performance took place when he sat in with Eric Clapton's band at a concert in Florida in the summer of 1982.

Personal life
Muddy Waters' longtime partner, Geneva Wade, died of cancer on March 15, 1973. Gaining custody of his three children, Joseph, Renee, and Rosalind, he moved them into his home, eventually buying a new house in Westmont, Illinois. In 1977, he met Marva Jean Brooks, whom he nicknamed "Sunshine", at a Florida hotel. Eric Clapton served as best man at their wedding in 1979.

His sons, Larry "Mud" Morganfield and Big Bill Morganfield, are also blues singers and musicians. In 2017 his youngest son, Joseph "Mojo" Morganfield, began publicly performing the blues. Joseph was known to play occasionally with his brothers. Mojo died in 2020 at the age of 56.

Death

Muddy Waters died in his sleep from heart failure, at his home in Westmont, Illinois, on April 30, 1983, from cancer-related complications. He was taken from his Westmont home, which he lived in for the last decade of his life, to Good Samaritan Hospital in Downers Grove, Illinois, where he was pronounced dead. His funeral was held on May 4, 1983. Throngs of blues musicians and fans attended his funeral at Restvale Cemetery in Alsip, Illinois. He is buried next to his wife, Geneva.

After his death, a lengthy court battle ensued between his heirs and Scott Cameron, his former manager. In 2010, his heir was petitioning for the courts to appoint Mercy Morganfield, his daughter, as administrator and distribute remaining assets, which mainly consists of copyrights to his music. The petition to reopen the estate was successful. In May 2018, the heirs' lawyer sought to hold Scott Cameron's wife in contempt for diverting royalty income. However, the heirs asked for that citation not to be pursued. The next court date was set for July 10, 2018.  As of 2022, the dispute remained unresolved.

Legacy
Two years after his death, the city of Chicago paid tribute to him by designating the one-block section between 900 and 1000 East 43rd Street near his former home on the south side "Honorary Muddy Waters Drive". In 2017, a ten stories-mural commissioned as a part of the Chicago Blues Festival and designed by Brazilian artist Eduardo Kobra was painted on the side of the building at 17 North State Street, at the corner of State and Washington Streets. The Chicago suburb of Westmont, where he lived the last decade of his life, named a section of Cass Avenue near his home "Honorary Muddy Waters Way".

In 2008, a Mississippi Blues Trail marker has been placed in Clarksdale, Mississippi, by the Mississippi Blues Commission designating the site of Muddy Waters' cabin. He also received a plaque on the Clarksdale Walk of Fame.

Muddy Waters' Chicago Home in the Kenwood neighborhood is in the process of being named a Chicago Landmark.

A crater on Mercury was named in his honor in 2016 by the IAU.

Influence
The British band The Rolling Stones named themselves after Muddy Waters' 1950 song "Rollin' Stone". Jimi Hendrix recalled that "I first heard him as a little boy and it scared me to death". The band Cream covered "Rollin' and Tumblin'" on their 1966 debut album, Fresh Cream. Eric Clapton was a big fan of Muddy Waters while growing up, and his music influenced Clapton's music career. "Rollin' and Tumblin'" was also covered by Canned Heat at the Monterey Pop Festival and later adapted by Bob Dylan on his album Modern Times. One of Led Zeppelin's biggest hits, "Whole Lotta Love", has its lyrics heavily influenced by the Muddy Waters hit "You Need Love" (written by Willie Dixon). "Hoochie Coochie Man", was covered by Allman Brothers Band, Humble Pie, Steppenwolf, Supertramp and Fear. In 1993, Paul Rodgers released the album Muddy Water Blues: A Tribute to Muddy Waters, on which he covered a number of his songs, including "Louisiana Blues", "Rollin' Stone", "(I'm your) Hoochie Coochie Man" and "I'm Ready" in collaboration with guitarists such as Gary Moore, Brian May and Jeff Beck. Angus Young, of the rock group AC/DC, has cited Muddy as one of his influences. The AC/DC song title "You Shook Me All Night Long" came from lyrics of the Muddy Waters song "You Shook Me", written by Willie Dixon and J. B. Lenoir. Earl Hooker first recorded it as an instrumental, which was then overdubbed with vocals by Muddy Waters in 1962. Led Zeppelin also covered it on their debut album.

In 1981 ZZ Top guitarist Billy Gibbons went to visit the Delta Blues Museum in Clarksdale with The Blues magazine founder Jim O'Neal. The museum's director, Sid Graves, brought Gibbons to visit Waters original house, and encouraged him to pick up a piece of scrap lumber that was originally part of the roof. Gibbons eventually converted the wood into a guitar. Named Muddywood, the instrument is now exhibited at the Delta Blues Museum in Clarksdale.

Following his death, fellow blues musician B.B. King told Guitar World magazine, "It's going to be years and years before most people realize how greatly he contributed to American music." John P. Hammond told Guitar World magazine, "Muddy was a master of just the right notes. It was profound guitar playing, deep and simple ... more country blues transposed to the electric guitar, the kind of playing that enhanced the lyrics, gave profundity to the words themselves."

Muddy Waters' songs have been featured in long-time fan Martin Scorsese's movies, including The Color of Money, Goodfellas, and Casino. A 1970s recording of his mid-'50s hit "Mannish Boy" was used in the films Goodfellas, Better Off Dead, Risky Business, and the rockumentary The Last Waltz. In 1988 "Mannish Boy" was also used in a Levi's 501 commercial and re-released in Europe as a single with "(I'm your) Hoochie Coochie Man" on the flip side.

Awards and recognition

Grammy Awards

Rock and Roll Hall of Fame
The Rock and Roll Hall of Fame listed four songs of Muddy Waters among the 500 Songs That Shaped Rock and Roll.

Blues Foundation Awards

Inductions

U.S. Postage Stamp

Discography

Studio albums
 Muddy Waters Sings "Big Bill" (Chess, 1960)
 Folk Singer (Chess, 1964)
 Muddy, Brass & the Blues (Chess, 1966)
 Electric Mud (Cadet, 1968)
 After the Rain (Cadet, 1969)
 Fathers and Sons (Chess, 1969)
 The London Muddy Waters Sessions (Chess, 1972)
 Can't Get No Grindin' (Chess, 1973)
 Mud in Your Ear (Muse, 1973)
 London Revisited (Chess, 1974) split album with Howlin' Wolf
 "Unk" in Funk (Chess, 1974)
 The Muddy Waters Woodstock Album (Chess, 1975)
 Hard Again (Blue Sky, 1977)
 I'm Ready (Blue Sky, 1978)
 King Bee (Blue Sky, 1981)

Notes

References

External links

 
 

1913 births
1983 deaths
20th-century African-American male singers
20th-century American guitarists
African-American guitarists
African-American male singer-songwriters
American blues guitarists
American blues singer-songwriters
American male guitarists
American street performers
Blind Pig Records artists
Blues musicians from Mississippi
Blues revival musicians
Burials at Restvale Cemetery
Chess Records artists
Chicago blues musicians
Delta blues musicians
Electric blues musicians
Grammy Lifetime Achievement Award winners
Guitarists from Illinois
Guitarists from Mississippi
Lead guitarists
Mississippi Blues Trail
Muse Records artists
Musicians from Clarksdale, Mississippi
People from Issaquena County, Mississippi
People from Westmont, Illinois